The Thannhauser Galleries were established by the Thannhauser family in early 20th century Europe. Their cutting-edge exhibitions helped forge the reputations of many of the most important Modernist artists.

History
Heinrich Thannhauser (1859–1935) opened the first of the Thannhauser Galleries in Munich in the fall of 1909, after deciding to leave the gallery that he had previously opened with his friend Franz Josef Brakl. He called his new business the Modern Gallery (Moderne Galerie) and established it in the glass-domed Arcopalais at Theatinerstraße 7, in the heart of Munich's shopping district. The gallery was, by most accounts, one of the largest and most beautiful art galleries in the city. Designed by local architect Paul Wenz, it occupied over 2,600 square feet of the glass-domed Arcopalais. The gallery was divided between two floors, with nine exhibition rooms on the ground floor and an open, skylit gallery on the floor above. Several of the rooms were set up as domestic environments, as was fashionable at the time.

In its early years, the Moderne Galerie (more commonly known as the Moderne Galerie Heinrich Thannhauser) exhibited the work of some of the most notable French Impressionists, Post-Impressionists, and Italian Futurists. It also presented the earliest exhibitions of contemporary German movements and artists who would later come to define the avant-garde: Neue Künstlervereinigung München (New Artists' Association of Munich) in 1909, and Der Blaue Reiter (The Blue Rider) in 1911. Both exhibitions featured the work of Vasily Kandinsky, considered by many to be the pioneer of abstraction in art. The gallery also participated in the Armory Show of 1913, the watershed exhibition that introduced European Modernism to the United States, and mounted the first major Pablo Picasso retrospective during the same year.

In 1919, Heinrich Thannhauser's son, Justin K. Thannhauser (1892–1976), established a branch of the gallery in Lucerne (Luzern), Switzerland. He ran the branch until 1921, when he was called back to Munich to assist his father, who had developed a serious condition in his larynx. The Lucerne gallery continued to be under Justin's direction until 1928, when his cousin Siegfried Rosengart assumed control and changed its name to Galerie Rosengart.

Over the years, Heinrich and Justin Thannhauser purchased, traded or had on consignment 107 works by Van Gogh or attributed to him. In 2017, the Van Gogh Museum in Amsterdam published the catalogue The Thannhauser Gallery: Marketing Van Gogh.

Justin established a third branch in Berlin in 1927. During the 1930s, however, the business operations of all of the Thannhauser Galleries were sanctioned and delayed by the Nazi government. The Nazis were vehemently opposed to the art of the avant-garde, which they branded as "degenerate art." After the death of Heinrich in 1935 and the formal closing of the Galleries in 1937, Thannhauser and his family left for Paris. In 1940, they moved to New York, where Justin, together with his second wife, Hilde (1919–91), established himself as an art dealer.

The Thannhausers’ support of artistic progress, and their advancement of the early careers of artists like Kandinsky, Franz Marc, and Paul Klee, paralleled the vision of the Solomon R. Guggenheim Museum’s founder, Solomon R. Guggenheim (1861–1949). In recognition of that connection, and in honor of his first wife and two sons (who died at tragically young ages), Justin Thannhauser bequeathed the most essential and iconic works of his collection, including over 30 works by Picasso, to the Guggenheim Foundation in 1963. Beginning in 1965, the works were on loan to the museum and on view in the Thannhauser Wing. The collection formally entered the Guggenheim's permanent holdings in 1978, two years after Thannhauser's death, and the museum received a bequest of 10 additional works after the death of Hilde Thannhauser in 1991. The gift, containing over 70 works in total, provides an important antecedent to the Guggenheim Museum's contemporary collection and thus has allowed the institution to represent the full range of modern art.

Artists
Notable exhibited artists include:

Max Beckmann
Georges Braque
Mary Cassatt
Paul Cézanne
Edgar Degas
André Derain
Otto Dix
Paul Gauguin
Vincent van Gogh
George Grosz
Vasily Kandinsky
Paul Klee
Max Klinger
Max Liebermann
Édouard Manet
Henri Matisse
Claude Monet
Edvard Munch
Pablo Picasso
Camille Pissarro
Pierre-Auguste Renoir
Alfred Sisley
Henri de Toulouse-Lautrec
Maurice de Vlaminck

Catalogues
Up to 1914, all catalogues were based on exhibitions.

Moderne Kunsthandlung Brakl & Thannhauser
1908: Vincent van Gogh – Prices indicated ("Die Preise verstehen sich in holländ. Gulden.")

Moderne Galerie Heinrich Thannhauser, München
1909: Impressionisten
January 1910: Cuno Amiet & Giovanni Giacometti
Spring 1910: Félix Vallotton
April 1910: Édouard Manet (aus der Sammlung Pellerin)
Summer 1910: (Heymel Collection)
August 1910: Paul Gauguin
mid-July – August 15, 1911: Carl Schuch
Oct. 1911: (Theodor Alt)
February 13 – March 10, 1912: Kollektiv-Ausstellung Edvard Munch

War time selections from the stock of the gallery
Moderne Galerie Heinrich Thannhauser (folder, without date) (pre-1916)
Katalog der Modernen Galerie Heinrich Thannhauser, introduction by Wilhelm Hausenstein and 174 reproductions, Munich 1916
Nachtragswerk I mit 76 Abbildungen zur grossen Katalogausgabe 1916, Moderne Galerie Heinrich Thannhauser, Munich, September 1916
Nachtragswerk II mit 105 Abbildungen zur grossen Katalogausgabe 1916, Moderne Galerie Heinrich Thannhauser, Munich, Juli 1917
Nachtragswerk III mit 115 ganzseitigen Abbildungen zur grossen Katalogausgabe 1916, Moderne Galerie Heinrich Thannhauser, Munich, 1918

Post WWI-exhibitions

Galerien Thannhauser, Berlin – Luzern – München
Eröffnungs-Ausstellung unseres neuen Berliner Hauses, Bellevuestr. 13, illustrated catalogue, dated June 1927

References

Notes

Sources
 von Lüttichau, Mario Andreas: "Die Moderne Galerie Heinrich Thannhauser in München," in: Junge, Henrike (Ed.), Avantgarde und Publikum: Zur Rezeption avantgardistischer Kunst in Deutschland 1905–1933, Böhlau, Köln, Weimar & Wien 1992, pp. 299–306
 Drutt, Matthew: "A Showcase for Modern Art: The Thannhauser Collection," in: Drutt, Matthew (Ed.), Thannhauser: The Thannhauser Collection of the Guggenheim Museum, The Solomon R. Guggenheim Foundation 2001, pp. 1–25

1909 establishments in Germany
German art dealers
Art galleries established in 1909